Denstone is a village and civil parish situated between the towns of Uttoxeter in East Staffordshire and Ashbourne in Derbyshire. It is located next to the River Churnet. The All Saints village church, vicarage and school were built by Sir Thomas Percival Heywood, 2nd Baronet in the mid 19th century. Denstone College is situated to the west of the village.

In the late 19th century and early 20th century, Denstone had a railway station of its own which closed to passengers in 1965. Part of this railway line is now preserved as the Churnet Valley Railway. It is hoped that one day the line would extend back beyond the village station site via Oakamoor, but this is unlikely due to the large number of buildings near the railway. The present Lord of the Manor of Denstone is Daniel J. Barton, stepson of the late Clifford Bailey.

Notable people
David Edwards, second Millionaire winner on Who wants to be a Millionaire?

See also
Listed buildings in Denstone

References

External links

Villages in Staffordshire
Towns and villages of the Peak District
Borough of East Staffordshire